Platyopsis is a genus of flies in the family Dolichopodidae. It contains a single species, Platyopsis maroccanus, from Morocco and Algeria. According to a cladistic analysis by Brooks (2005), the genus appears closely related to Stenopygium and Pelastoneurus.

References

Dolichopodinae
Dolichopodidae genera
Monotypic Diptera genera
Diptera of Africa
Insects of North Africa